The 2016–17 Toronto Raptors season was the 22nd season of the franchise in the National Basketball Association (NBA). On March 25, 2017, the team clinched a team-record fourth straight berth to the NBA playoffs. They finished the regular season with a 51–31 record as the 3rd seed. In the playoffs, the Raptors defeated the Milwaukee Bucks in the First Round of the playoffs in six games, facing the defending NBA champion Cleveland Cavaliers in the Semifinals, whom they met in last season's Eastern Conference Finals and lost to in six games. However, the Raptors would be swept by the Cavaliers in four games making it the second time in three years that the Raptors were swept in the playoff, having been swept by the Washington Wizards in the first round of the 2015 Playoffs.

Draft

Standings

Division

Conference

Record vs opponents

(* game decided in overtime)

Game log

Pre-season

|-style="background:#bfb;"
|1
|October 1
|Warriors
|
|DeMarre Carroll (14)
|Jared Sullinger (10)
|Kyle Lowry (4)
|Rogers Arena19,000
|1–0
|-style="background:#fbb;"
|2
|October 3
|Nuggets
|
|Terrence Ross (23)
|Jonas Valančiūnas (9)
|Cory Joseph (4)
|Scotiabank Saddledome19,600
|1–1
|-style="background:#fbb;"
|3
|October 5
|@ L. A. Clippers
|
|DeMar DeRozan (20)
|Jonas Valančiūnas (6)
|Nogueira, VanVleet (3)
|STAPLES Center13,957
|1–2
|-style="background:#bfb;"
|4
|October 13
|@ Cavaliers
|
|Kyle Lowry (25)
|Jonas Valančiūnas (6)
|Kyle Lowry (6)
|Quicken Loans Arena18,834
|2–2
|-style="background:#bfb;"
|5
|October 14
|San Lorenzo
|
|Fred VanVleet (31)
|Jakob Poeltl (6)
|Heslip, VanVleet (5)
|Air Canada Centre15,113
|3–2
|-style="background:#bfb;"
|6
|October 19
|@ Pistons
|
|Kyle Lowry (27)
|Jonas Valančiūnas (12)
|Cory Joseph (4)
|The Palace of Auburn Hills12,334
|4–2
|-style="background:#fbb;"
|7
|October 21
|@ Wizards
|
|DeMar DeRozan (34)
|Poeltl , VanVleet (6)
|Kyle Lowry (5)
|Verizon Center11,967
|4–3

Regular season

|- style="background:#bfb;"
| 1
| October 26
| Detroit
| 
| DeMar DeRozan (40)
| Jonas Valančiūnas (11)
| Kyle Lowry (8)
| Air Canada Centre19,800
| 1–0
|- style="background:#fbb;"
| 2
| October 28
| Cleveland
| 
| DeMar DeRozan (32)
| Jonas Valančiūnas (17)
| Kyle Lowry (4)
| Air Canada Centre19,800
| 1–1
|- style="background:#bfb;"
| 3
| October 31
| Denver
| 
| DeMar DeRozan (33)
| Jonas Valančiūnas (9)
| Kyle Lowry (7)
| Air Canada Centre19,800
| 2–1

|- style="background:#bfb;"
| 4
| November 2
| @ Washington
| 
| DeMar DeRozan (40)
| Jonas Valančiūnas (7)
| DeMar DeRozan (5)
| Verizon Center19,581
| 3–1
|- style="background:#bfb;"
| 5
| November 4
| Miami
| 
| DeMar DeRozan (34)
| Jonas Valančiūnas (11)
| Kyle Lowry (5)
| Air Canada Centre19,800
| 4–1
|- style="background:#fbb;"
| 6
| November 6
| Sacramento
| 
| DeMar DeRozan (23)
| DeMarre Carroll (8)
| Kyle Lowry (10)
| Air Canada Centre19,800
| 4–2
|- style="background:#bfb;"
| 7
| November 9
| @ Oklahoma City
| 
| DeMar DeRozan (37)
| Kyle Lowry (9)
| Kyle Lowry (13)
| Chesapeake Energy Arena18,203
| 5–2
|- style="background:#bfb;"
| 8
| November 11
| @ Charlotte
| 
| DeMar DeRozan (34)
| Valančiūnas, Lowry (8)
| Kyle Lowry (6)
| Time Warner Cable Arena18,107
| 6–2
|- style="background:#bfb;"
| 9
| November 12
| New York
| 
| DeMar DeRozan (33)
| Lucas Nogueira (10)
| Kyle Lowry (6)
| Air Canada Centre19,800
| 7–2
|- style="background:#fbb;"
| 10
| November 15
| @ Cleveland
| 
| Kyle Lowry (28)
| Jonas Valančiūnas (9)
| Kyle Lowry (9)
| Quicken Loans Arena20,562
| 7–3
|- style="background:#fbb;"
| 11
| November 16
| Golden State
| 
| DeMar DeRozan (34)
| Pascal Siakam (9)
| Kyle Lowry (5)
| Air Canada Centre21,050
| 7–4
|- style="background:#bfb;"
| 12
| November 18
| @ Denver
| 
| DeMar DeRozan (30)
| Jonas Valančiūnas (9)
| Kyle Lowry (13)
| Pepsi Center12,476
| 8–4
|- style="background:#fbb;"
| 13
| November 20
| @ Sacramento
| 
| Kyle Lowry (25)
| Jonas Valančiūnas (14)
| Kyle Lowry (6)
| Golden 1 Center17,608
| 8–5
|- style="background:#fbb;"
| 14
| November 21
| @ L.A. Clippers
| 
| Kyle Lowry (27)
| Jonas Valančiūnas (8)
| Lowry, DeRozan (7)
| Staples Center19,060
| 8–6
|- style="background:#bfb;"
| 15
| November 23
| @ Houston
| 
| DeMar DeRozan (24)
| Jonas Valančiūnas (16)
| Lowry, DeRozan (9)
| Toyota Center18,055
| 9–6
|- style="background:#bfb;"
| 16
| November 25
| @ Milwaukee
| 
| DeMar DeRozan (26)
| Siakam, DeRozan (7)
| Kyle Lowry (6)
| BMO Harris Bradley Center16,223
| 10–6
|- style="background:#bfb;"
| 17
| November 28
| Philadelphia
| 
| Kyle Lowry (24)
| Jonas Valančiūnas (11)
| Kyle Lowry (8)
| Air Canada Centre19,800
| 11–6
|- style="background:#bfb;"
| 18
| November 30
| Memphis
| 
| Kyle Lowry (29)
| DeMar DeRozan (9)
| Kyle Lowry (8)
| Air Canada Centre19,800
| 12–6

|- style="background:#bfb;"
| 19
| December 2
| L.A. Lakers
| 
| Kyle Lowry (24)
| Siakam, Valančiūnas, Patterson, Powell (7)
| Kyle Lowry (7)
| Air Canada Centre19,800
| 13–6
|- style="background:#bfb;"
| 20
| December 3
| Atlanta
| 
| DeMar DeRozan (21)
| Nogueira, Lowry (8)
| Kyle Lowry (8)
| Air Canada Centre19,800
| 14–6
|- style="background:#fbb;"
| 21
| December 5
| Cleveland
| 
| DeMar DeRozan (31)
| Jonas Valančiūnas (10)
| Kyle Lowry (9)
| Air Canada Centre19,800
| 14–7
|- style="background:#bfb;"
| 22
| December 8
| Minnesota
| 
| DeMar DeRozan (27)
| Jonas Valančiūnas (10)
| Kyle Lowry (11)
| Air Canada Centre19,800
| 15–7
|- style="background:#bfb;"
| 23
| December 9
| @ Boston
| 
| Kyle Lowry (34)
| Valančiūnas, Patterson (10)
| Patrick Patterson (4)
| TD Garden18,624
| 16–7
|- style="background:#bfb;"
| 24
| December 12
| Milwaukee
| 
| DeMar DeRozan (30)
| Jonas Valančiūnas (13)
| Kyle Lowry (7)
| Air Canada Centre19.800
| 17–7
|- style="background:#bfb;"
| 25
| December 14
| @ Philadelphia
| 
| DeMar DeRozan (31)
| Jonas Valančiūnas (10)
| Lowry, Joseph (7)
| Wells Fargo Center16,192
| 18–7
|- style="background:#fbb;"
| 26
| December 16
| Atlanta
| 
| DeMar DeRozan (34)
| Jonas Valančiūnas (6)
| Kyle Lowry (6)
| Air Canada Centre19,800
| 18–8
|- style="background:#bfb;"
| 27
| December 18
| @ Orlando
| 
| DeMar DeRozan (31)
| Jonas Valančiūnas (13)
| Kyle Lowry (10)
| Amway Center17,251
| 19–8
|- style="background:#bfb;"
| 28
| December 20
| Brooklyn
| 
| Kyle Lowry (23)
| Jonas Valančiūnas (14)
| Kyle Lowry (8)
| Air Canada Centre19,800
| 20–8
|- style="background:#bfb;"
| 29
| December 23
| @ Utah
| 
| Kyle Lowry (36)
| Jonas Valančiūnas (7)
| Kyle Lowry (5)
| Vivint Smart Home Arena19,911
| 21–8
|- style="background:#bfb;"
| 30
| December 26
| @ Portland
| 
| Kyle Lowry (27)
| Jonas Valančiūnas (12)
| DeMar DeRozan (7)
| Moda Center19,393
| 22–8
|- style="background:#fbb;"
| 31
| December 28
| @ Golden State
| 
| DeMar DeRozan (29)
| Ross, Carroll (7)
| Kyle Lowry (11)
| ORACLE Arena19,596
| 22–9
|- style="background:#fbb;"
| 32
| December 29
| @ Phoenix
| 
| Lowry, DeRozan (24)
| Jonas Valančiūnas (10)
| Kyle Lowry (5)
| Talking Stick Resort Arena18,055
| 22–10

|- style="background:#bfb;"
| 33
| January 1
| @ L.A. Lakers
| 
| Kyle Lowry (41)
| Siakam, Valančiūnas (10)
| Kyle Lowry (7)
| Staples Center18,997
| 23–10
|- style="background:#fbb;"
| 34
| January 3
| @ San Antonio
| 
| Kyle Lowry (26)
| Jakob Poeltl (9)
| Cory Joseph (3)
| AT&T Center18,418
| 23–11
|- style="background:#bfb;"
| 35
| January 5
| Utah
| 
| Kyle Lowry (33)
| Jonas Valančiūnas (13)
| Kyle Lowry (5)
| Air Canada Centre19,800
| 24–11
|- style="background:#fbb;"
| 36
| January 7
| @ Chicago
| 
| DeMar DeRozan (36)
| Kyle Lowry (9)
| Kyle Lowry (12)
| United Center21,195
| 24–12
|- style="background:#fbb;"
| 37
| January 8
| Houston
| 
| DeMar DeRozan (36)
| DeMarre Carroll (8)
| Kyle Lowry (6)
| Air Canada Centre19,800
| 24–13
|- style="background:#bfb;"
| 38
| January 10
| Boston
| 
| DeMar DeRozan (41)
| Jonas Valančiūnas (23)
| Kyle Lowry (9)
| Air Canada Centre19,800
| 25–13
|- style="background:#bfb;"
| 39
| January 13
| Brooklyn
| 
| DeMar DeRozan (28)
| DeMarre Carroll (11)
| Kyle Lowry (6)
| Air Canada Centre19,800
| 26–13
|- style="background:#bfb;"
| 40
| January 15
| New York
| 
| DeMar DeRozan (23)
| Jonas Valančiūnas (16)
| Kyle Lowry (9)
| Air Canada Centre19,800
| 27–13
|- style="background:#bfb;"
| 41
| January 17
| @ Brooklyn
| 
| DeMar DeRozan (36)
| DeMar DeRozan (11)
| DeMar DeRozan (6)
| Barclays Center12,874
| 28–13
|- style="background:#fbb;"
| 42
| January 18
| @ Philadelphia
| 
| DeMar DeRozan (25)
| Jonas Valančiūnas (16)
| DeMar DeRozan (6)
| Wells Fargo Center17,223
| 28–14
|- style="background:#fbb;"
| 43
| January 20
| @ Charlotte
| 
| Kyle Lowry (24)
| Jonas Valančiūnas (6)
| Kyle Lowry (3)
| Spectrum Center18,378
| 28–15
|- style="background:#fbb;"
| 44
| January 22
| Phoenix
| 
| DeMar DeRozan (22)
| Jonas Valančiūnas (12)
| Kyle Lowry (6)
| Air Canada Centre19,800
| 28–16
|- style="background:#fbb;"
| 45
| January 24
| San Antonio
| 
| Kyle Lowry (30)
| Jonas Valančiūnas (13)
| Joseph, Valančiūnas, Lowry, Powell (2)
| Air Canada Centre19,800
| 28–17
|- style="background:#fbb;"
| 46
| January 25
| @ Memphis
| 
| Kyle Lowry (29)
| Jonas Valančiūnas (12)
| Kyle Lowry (8)
| FedExForum15,904
| 28–18
|- style="background:#bfb;"
| 47
| January 27
| Milwaukee
| 
| Kyle Lowry (32)
| Jonas Valančiūnas (11)
| Kyle Lowry (6)
| Air Canada Centre19,800
| 29–18
|- style="background:#fbb;"
| 48
| January 29
| Orlando
| 
| Kyle Lowry (33)
| Patrick Patterson (10)
| Kyle Lowry (8)
| Air Canada Centre19,800
| 29–19
|- style="background:#bfb;"
| 49
| January 31
| New Orleans
| 
| Kyle Lowry (33)
| Jonas Valančiūnas (12)
| Kyle Lowry (10)
| Air Canada Centre19,800
| 30–19

|- style="background:#fbb;"
| 50
| February 1
| @ Boston
| 
| Kyle Lowry (32)
| Carroll, Sullinger, Ross (6)
| Kyle Lowry (5)
| TD Garden18,624
| 30–20
|- style="background:#fbb;"
| 51
| February 3
| @ Orlando
| 
| Lowry, Powell, Valančiūnas (18)
| Jonas Valančiūnas (11)
| Kyle Lowry (7)
| Amway Center17,141
| 30–21
|- style="background:#bfb;"
| 52
| February 5
| @ Brooklyn
| 
| Jonas Valančiūnas (22)
| Kyle Lowry (11)
| Kyle Lowry (11)
| Barclays Center14,245
| 31–21
|- style="background:#bfb;"
| 53
| February 6
| L.A. Clippers
| 
| DeMar DeRozan (31)
| Jonas Valančiūnas (12)
| Kyle Lowry (8)
| Air Canada Centre19,800
| 32–21
|- style="background:#fbb;"
| 54
| February 8
| @ Minnesota
| 
| DeMar DeRozan (30)
| DeMarre Carroll (9)
| Kyle Lowry (5)
| Target Center13,832
| 32–22
|- style="background:#fbb;"
| 55
| February 12
| Detroit
| 
| DeMar DeRozan (26)
| Jonas Valančiūnas (9)
| Kyle Lowry (5)
| Air Canada Centre19,800
| 32–23
|- style="background:#fbb;"
| 56
| February 14
| @ Chicago
| 
| Kyle Lowry (22)
| Jonas Valančiūnas (9)
| Lowry, Powell (4)
| United Center21,220
| 32–24
|- style="background:#bfb;"
| 57
| February 15
| Charlotte
| 
| Kyle Lowry (21)
| Carroll, Valančiūnas (11)
| Kyle Lowry (6)
| Air Canada Centre19,800
| 33–24
|- style="background:#bfb;"
| 58
| February 24
| Boston
| 
| DeMar DeRozan (43)
| P. J. Tucker (10)
| Cory Joseph (6)
| Air Canada Centre19,800
| 34–24
|- style="background:#bfb;"
| 59
| February 26
| Portland
| 
| DeMar DeRozan (33)
| Serge Ibaka (10)
| Cory Joseph (6)
| Air Canada Centre19,800
| 35–24
|- style="background:#bfb;"
| 60
| February 27
| @ New York
| 
| DeMar DeRozan (33)
| DeMar DeRozan (8)
| Cory Joseph (4)
| Madison Square Garden19,812
| 36–24

|- style="background:#fbb;"
| 61
| March 1
| Washington
| 
| DeMar DeRozan (24)
| Serge Ibaka (12)
| Carroll, Powell, Wright (2)
| Air Canada Centre19,800
| 36–25
|- style="background:#bfb;"
| 62
| March 3
| @ Washington
| 
| DeMar DeRozan (32)
| DeMar DeRozan (13)
| DeMar DeRozan (5)
| Verizon Center20,356
| 37–25
|- style="background:#fbb;"
| 63
| March 4
| @ Milwaukee
| 
| Serge Ibaka (19)
| Jonas Valančiūnas (7)
| Cory Joseph (8)
| BMO Harris Bradley Center16,775
| 37–26
|- style="background:#bfb;"
| 64
| March 8
| @ New Orleans
| 
| Jonas Valančiūnas (25)
| Jonas Valančiūnas (13)
| DeMar DeRozan (6)
| Smoothie King Center14,543
| 38–26
|- style="background:#fbb;"
| 65
| March 10
| @ Atlanta
| 
| DeMar DeRozan (28)
| Jonas Valančiūnas (12)
| Cory Joseph (8)
| Philips Arena16,078
| 38–27
|- style="background:#fbb;"
| 66
| March 11
| @ Miami
| 
| DeMar DeRozan (17)
| Jonas Valančiūnas (10)
| Delon Wright (3)
| American Airlines Arena19,745
| 38–28
|- style="background:#bfb;"
| 67
| March 13
| Dallas
| 
| DeMar DeRozan (25)
| Jonas Valančiūnas (12)
| Cory Joseph (4)
| Air Canada Centre19,800
| 39–28
|- style="background:#fbb;"
| 68
| March 16
| Oklahoma City
| 
| DeMar DeRozan (22)
| Jonas Valančiūnas (5)
| Cory Joseph (6)
| Air Canada Centre19,800
| 39–29
|- style="background:#bfb;"
| 69
| March 17
| @ Detroit
| 
| Serge Ibaka (17)
| Ibaka, Tucker (9)
| DeRozan, Joseph (6)
| The Palace of Auburn Hills16,541
| 40–29
|- style="background:#bfb;"
| 70
| March 19
| Indiana
| 
| DeMar DeRozan (22)
| Jonas Valančiūnas (13)
| Cory Joseph (9)
| Air Canada Centre19,800
| 41–29
|- style="background:#bfb;"
| 71
| March 21
| Chicago
| 
| DeMar DeRozan (42)
| P. J. Tucker (12)
| DeMar DeRozan (8)
| Air Canada Centre19,800
| 42–29
|- style="background:#bfb;"
| 72
| March 23
| @ Miami
| 
| DeMar DeRozan (40)
| Patrick Patterson (10)
| Tucker, DeRozan, Wright (3)
| American Airlines Arena19,745
| 43–29
|- style="background:#bfb;"
| 73
| March 25
| @ Dallas
| 
| Ibaka, DeRozan (18)
| P. J. Tucker (9)
| DeMar DeRozan (6)
| American Airlines Center19,934
| 44–29
|- style="background:#bfb;"
| 74
| March 27
| Orlando
| 
| DeMar DeRozan (36)
| Jonas Valančiūnas (9)
| Cory Joseph (13)
| Air Canada Centre19,800
| 45–29
|- style="background:#fbb;"
| 75
| March 29
| Charlotte
| 
| DeMar DeRozan (28)
| Jonas Valančiūnas (15)
| DeMar DeRozan (8)
| Air Canada Centre19,800
| 45–30
|- style="background:#bfb;"
| 76
| March 31
| Indiana
| 
| DeMar DeRozan (40)
| Jonas Valančiūnas (17)
| Joseph, Wright (6)
| Air Canada Centre19,800
| 46–30

|- style="background:#bfb;"
| 77
| April 2
| Philadelphia
| 
| Serge Ibaka (24)
| Jonas Valančiūnas (8)
| DeMar DeRozan (9)
| Air Canada Centre19,800
| 47–30
|- style="background:#fbb;"
| 78
| April 4
| @ Indiana
| 
| DeMar DeRozan (27)
| Valančiūnas, Ibaka (10)
| Delon Wright (4)
| Bankers Life Fieldhouse16,524
| 47–31
|- style="background:#bfb;"
| 79
| April 5
| @ Detroit
| 
| Kyle Lowry (27)
| Serge Ibaka (7)
| Lowry, DeRozan (10)
| The Palace of Auburn Hills22,076
| 48–31
|- style="background:#bfb;"
| 80
| April 7
| Miami
| 
| DeMar DeRozan (38)
| Jonas Valančiūnas (10)
| Kyle Lowry (6)
| Air Canada Centre19,800
| 49–31
|- style="background:#bfb;"
| 81
| April 9
| @ New York
| 
| DeMar DeRozan (35)
| Valančiūnas, Lowry, Tucker, Poeltl (7)
| Kyle Lowry (11)
| Madison Square Garden19,812
| 50–31
|- style="background:#bfb;"
| 82
| April 12
| @ Cleveland
| 
| Norman Powell (25)
| Pascal Siakam (10)
| Fred VanVleet (6)
| Quicken Loans Arena20,562
| 51–31

Playoffs

|- style="background:#fbb;"
| 1
| April 15
| Milwaukee
| 
| DeMar DeRozan (27)
| Serge Ibaka (14)
| Kyle Lowry (6)
| Air Canada Centre19,800
| 0–1
|- style="background:#bfb;"
| 2
| April 18
| Milwaukee
| 
| DeMar DeRozan (23)
| Jonas Valančiūnas (10)
| Serge Ibaka (6)
| Air Canada Centre20,077
| 1–1
|- style="background:#fbb;"
| 3
| April 20
| @ Milwaukee
| 
| Lowry, Wright (13)
| Pöltl, Valančiūnas (7)
| Cory Joseph (3)
| Bradley Center18,717
| 1–2
|- style="background:#bfb;"
| 4
| April 22
| @ Milwaukee
| 
| DeMar DeRozan (33)
| DeMar DeRozan (9)
| DeMar DeRozan (5)
| Bradley Center18,717
| 2–2
|- style="background:#bfb;"
| 5
| April 24
| Milwaukee
| 
| Norman Powell (25)
| Jonas Valančiūnas (7)
| Kyle Lowry (10)
| Air Canada Centre20,251
| 3–2
|- style="background:#bfb;"
| 6
| April 27
| @ Milwaukee
| 
| DeMar DeRozan (32)
| Serge Ibaka (11)
| Kyle Lowry (4)
| Bradley Center18,717
| 4–2

|- style="background:#fbb;"
| 1
| May 1
| @ Cleveland
| 
| Kyle Lowry (20)
| P. J. Tucker (11)
| Kyle Lowry (11)
| Quicken Loans Arena20,562
| 0–1
|- style="background:#fbb;"
| 2
| May 3
| @ Cleveland
| 
| Jonas Valančiūnas (23)
| Ibaka, Joseph, Powell, Valančiūnas (5)
| Kyle Lowry (5)
| Quicken Loans Arena20,562
| 0–2
|- style="background:#fbb;"
| 3
| May 5
| Cleveland
| 
| DeMar DeRozan (37)
| Jonas Valančiūnas (8)
| Cory Joseph (6)
| Air Canada Centre20,384
| 0–3
|- style="background:#fbb;"
| 4
| May 7
| Cleveland
| 
| Serge Ibaka (23)
| P. J. Tucker (12)
| Cory Joseph (12)
| Air Canada Centre20,307
| 0–4

Roster

Transactions

Free agency

Re-signed

Additions

Subtractions

References

Toronto Raptors seasons
Toronto Raptors
Toronto Raptors
Toronto Raptors
Tor